Aliza Ayaz is an international climate activist, and a United Nations Goodwill Ambassador. She jointly won the United Kingdom Youth Outstanding Commitment to Sustainability Award at University College London (UCL), and has spoken at United Nations, London International Model United Nations, and UK Parliamentary events. She is a member of the National Youth Council Pakistan. She is known for setting up the Climate Action Society at UCL which helped inspire UK-wide youth action against climate change, leading to the climate emergency declaration at the UK Parliament. In October 2020 she was appointed as the United Nations youth ambassador for Sustainable Development Goal 13 (SDG13), the second Pakistani student after Malala Yousafzai to have received this honour.

Early life and education

Ayaz was born in Dubai in the United Arab Emirates, and has lived most of her life around the Middle East. Before moving to London, she studied at Karachi Grammar School and Dubai British School.

She studied at University College London for her bachelor's degree followed by an MSc in infectious disease epidemiology.

Career

While a student, Ayaz founded the Climate Action Society (CAS) at UCL in 2018.  Ayaz heads a series of London-based conferences, workshops, campaigns and the annual "Sustainability Symposium" hosted at UCL to engage the UK wide youth in pushing for climate resilience.

Ayaz organised workshops to motivate positive changes in climate-related behaviours with a range of experts given her passion to tackle the climate change health impacts as an emerging cause of morbidity that became apparent during her undergraduate studies. With her team at Climate Action Society, she is known to have facilitated diversity and inclusion in the fight against climate change through organising BME-focused networking dinners and conferences; and Ayaz was invited to a governmental round-table discussion by Lola Young, Baroness Young of Hornsey. The first UK-wide "Sustainability Symposium" which won the Students' Union "Event of the Year" award was introduced by her. The Symposium's concept connects various disciplines such as engineering and art to participate in the mitigation and adaptation to the effects of climate change.

Ayaz worked on rolling out the UK Kickstart Scheme with Rishi Sunak (Chancellor of the Exchequer at HM Treasury), providing funding to employers to create job placements for 16 to 24 year olds on Universal Credit. Simultaneously, she was also involved with the UK Green Homes Grant given her passion for tackling fuel poverty and carbon emissions.

Personal life
Ayaz resides in London, England with friends and family but is often travelling. She credits her parents Mohammad Ayaz and Dr. Rana Najmi for her success and inspiration.

Other work and media involvement
Ayaz is involved with global health policy initiatives at UCL's department under the Vice-Provost (Health) David Lomas. She is currently enrolled on an undergraduate program for Population Health Sciences at UCL.

She has written about universities' carbon-neutrality policies,.

Ayaz has been covered in CNN, BBC, Geo TV, ARY News, The Express Tribune, The Pakistan Daily, Parlho Pink, The Women Journal, The News International, Daily Pakistan, LexGaze Weekly, and in other media on subjects including sustainable fashion, environmental consultancy and student entrepreneurship.

She was ranked number three on The Pakistan Daily's 30 under 30 list in 2021.

Ayaz has been involved in the Ayaz Rana Foundation, a charity launched in 2022 to provide assistance to the impoverished and the deprived.

Research papers

References

External links
Official website
Aliza Ayaz at LinkedIn

Year of birth missing (living people)
British people of Pakistani descent
Alumni of University College London
Youth climate activists
Living people
People from Dubai
Karachi Grammar School alumni
Emirati environmentalists